Casimir of Koźle (ca. 1312 – by 2 March 1347) was a Duke of Koźle from 1336 until his death.

He was the eldest son of Duke Władysław of Bytom the only one by his first wife Beatrix, daughter of Otto V the Long, Margrave of Brandenburg–Salzwedel. Casimir was born between 1309 and 1316, probably ca. 1312.

Life
There is little known about Casimir's life. In 1336, after the death of Duke Leszek of Racibórz, the town of Koźle returned to Bytom according to the terms of the pledge made four years before; however, Duke Władysław was forced to immediately give the district to his firstborn son, Casimir.

About the rule of Casimir over Koźle, almost nothing is known. The only certainty is, because of his prodigality and huge debts, he stopped paying Peter's Pence, and in consequence he was excommunicated by the Church.

Casimir never married or had children. He was certainly dead before 2 March 1347 and it is unknown where he was buried.

References

1312 births
1340s deaths
Piast dynasty
People excommunicated by the Catholic Church